Olof Wallquist (1755 – April 30, 1800) was a Swedish statesman and ecclesiastic.

Biography
Wallqvist was born in Edsberg, Närke. He was ordained in 1776, became Doctor of Philosophy in 1779, court preacher to Queen Louisa Ulrica in 1780, and bishop of Växjö in 1787. He attracted the attention of Gustavus III by his eloquent preaching at the fashionable St Clara church at Stockholm. Gustavus at once took the young priest by the hand, appointed him, at twenty-five, one of his chaplains; made him a canon before he was thirty and a bishop at thirty-two, and finally placed him at the head of the newly appointed commission for reforming the ecclesiastical administration of the country.

Thus at thirty-four Wallqvist had nothing more to hope for but the primacy, which would infallibly have been his also had the archbishop died during the king's lifetime. Wallqvist was, however, much more of a politician than a churchman. His knowledge of human nature, inexhaustible energy, dauntless self-confidence and diplomatic finesse made him indispensable to Gustavus III. His seductive manners too often won over those whom his commanding eloquence failed to convince.

His political career began during the mutinous riksdag of 1786, when he came boldly forward as one of the royalist leaders. But it was at the stormy riksdag of 1789 that Wallqvist put forth all his powers. The retirement of the timid primate left him without an equal in the Estate of Clergy, and it was very largely due to his co-operation that the king was able to carry through the famous "Act of Unity and Security" which converted Sweden from a constitutional into a semi-absolute monarchy.

Nevertheless, even the combative Wallqvist was appalled when, on February 16, 1789, the king privately informed him that he meant on the following day soundly to trounce the Estate of Nobles in the presence of the three other estates and bend them to his royal will. A friend of compromise, like most of the men of his cloth, Wallqvist dissuaded all revolutionary expedients at the outset, though when the king proved immovable the bishop materially smoothed the way before him. At this memorable riksdag Wallqvist exhibited, moreover, financial ability of the highest order, and, as president of the ecclesiastical commission, assisted in balancing the budget and find the funds necessary for resuming the war with Russia.

During the brief riksdag of 1792, as a member of the secret committee, Wallqvist was at the very centre of affairs and rendered the king essential services. Indeed, it may be safely said that Gustavus III, during the last six years of his reign, mainly depended upon Wallqvist and his clerical colleague, Carl Gustaf Nordin, who were patriotic enough to subordinate even their private enmity to the royal service.

During the Reuterholm administration, Wallqvist, like the rest of the Gustavians, was kept remote from court. In 1800 he was recalled to the political arena. But his old rivalry with Nordin was resumed at the same time, and when the latter defeated a motion of the bishop's in the Estate of Clergy, at the diet of Norrköping, Wallqvist from sheer vexation had a stroke of apoplexy and died the same day.

Work
As bishop of Växjö, Wallqvist was remarkable for his extraordinary administrative ability. He did much for education and for the poorer clergy, and endowed the library of the gymnasium with 6000 volumes. As an author also he was more than distinguished. His Ecclesiastique Samlingar testify to his skill and diligence as a collector of manuscripts, while his Minnen och Bref, ed. E. V. Montan (Stockholm, 1878), is one of the most trustworthy and circumstantial documents relating to the Gustavian era of Swedish history.

Memberships 
Wallquist served as president of Pro Fide et Christianismo, a Christian education society.

References

  This work in turn cites:
 Robert Nisbet Bain, Gustavus III. and his Contemporaries 1746–1792: an overlooked chapter of eighteenth century history (London, 1895, vol. II)
 O. Wallqvist, Själfbiografiska anteckningar, ed. J. Helander (Uppsala, 1900)
 Josef Rosengren, Om Olof Wallqvist såsom biskop och eforus (Lund, 1901)

1755 births
1800 deaths
People from Lekeberg Municipality
Bishops of Växjö
18th-century Swedish politicians
Members of the Riksdag of the Estates